Habib Essid (born 1 June 1949) is a Tunisian politician who was Head of Government of Tunisia from 6 February 2015 to 27 August 2016. He was the first Head of Government to be appointed following the adoption of the new constitution and thus considered to be the first Head of Government of the Second Tunisian Republic. He previously served as Minister of the Interior in 2011.

Early life, education and professional life
Born in Sousse in 1949, Essid received his master's degree in economics from Tunis University and added a masters programme in agricultural economics from the University of Minnesota.

He started his career in the public sector, notably in the Ministry of Agriculture. In 1993, he was named cabinet director at the Ministry of Agriculture, remaining in that post until 1997. He later served as cabinet director at the Ministry of the Interior. In 2001, he was appointed as Secretary of State for Fishing and later on as Secretary of State for the Environment. From 2004 to 2010, Habib Essid was Executive Director of the International Olive Council, headquartered in Madrid.

After the Tunisian Revolution, he was appointed as Minister of the Interior in the government of Prime Minister Beji Caid Essebsi on 28 March 2011. He was also chosen by Hamadi Jebali to be his Security Advisor following the 23 October 2011 elections.

Head of Government of Tunisia 
On 5 January 2015, Essid was nominated as Head of Government  by Nidaa Tounes and asked to form a new government.

Initially, he formed a government composed of two political parties: Nidaa Tounes and the Free Patriotic Union. Following the announcement, all excluded political parties rejected the formation, leaving Essid short of the required 109 seats needed to obtain confidence.

On 2 February 2015 the newly appointed Head of Government announced an inclusive new coalition government whose members include representatives of the Islamist Ennahda party and the secular parties Nidaa Tounes, the Free Patriotic Union and the liberals of Afek Tounes. On 5 February 2015, Essid's cabinet was approved by the parliament. The cabinet was sworn in the following day.

On 26 June 2015, in the wake of the 2015 Sousse attacks, Essid promised to close 80 mosques within the week. The tourism industry, prior to the March Bardo National Museum attack, accounted for seven percent of Tunisia's GDP and almost 400,000 direct and indirect jobs. The government also plans to crack down on financing for certain associations as a countermeasure against another attack. Essid announced that:

Essid lost a parliamentary confidence vote on 30 July 2016; there were 118 votes against him and three in favor.

References

External links

1949 births
Living people
People from Sousse
Prime Ministers of Tunisia
21st-century Tunisian politicians
Interior ministers of Tunisia